Horseleg Mountain is a summit in Floyd County, Georgia, in the United States.

Horseleg Mountain is said to be shaped like the leg of a horse, hence the name.

References

Mountains of Floyd County, Georgia
Mountains of Georgia (U.S. state)